Ali Sami Yen, born Ali Sami Frashëri (20 May 1886 – 29 July 1951) was an Albanian-Turkish sports official best known as the founder of the Galatasaray Sports Club. After the enactment of law on family names in 1934, he took the surname Yen, which literally means "win" in the Turkish language.

Life 
Ali Sami Yen was born in Üsküdar (Istanbul), Turkey. He was the son of Sami Frashëri, one of the most famous Albanian writers, philosophers and playwrights.

He was a student at the prestigious Galatasaray High School in Istanbul. In October 1905, he decided with some of his fellow students to create a football club. At the beginning, the stated goal was "To play together like Englishmen, to have a color and a name, and to beat the other non-Turkish teams" according to him.

Ali Sami Yen founded the colours of Galatasaray, stating, "We were imagining brightness of yellow-red fire over our team and thinking that it would carry us from one victory to another."

In 1905, during the era of the Ottoman Empire, there were no laws for associations so the club could not be registered officially, but, after the 1912 Law of Association, the club registered legally.

Yen was the club's first president for 13 years, between 1905 and 1918, and again for a brief spell in 1925.
Besides founding Galatasaray SK, he made numerous other contributions to Turkish sports. He was president of the Turkish Olympic Committee between 1926 and 1931. He coached the Turkey national team in its first international match, in 1923 against Romania.

Ali Sami Yen died in 1951. He was laid to rest at the Feriköy Cemetery in Istanbul.

As founder and first president of Galatasaray SK, Ali Sami Yen's name was given to the Galatasaray's long time Ali Sami Yen Stadium which was built in 1964 and situated in the center of Istanbul in Mecidiyeköy. However, in January 2011, the club moved to its new home in the Türk Telekom Stadium in the Kâğıthane district while the old stadium was demolished to make way for the construction of a new commercial development.

Personal life
He was married to Fahriye Yen (born November 1900 and died 6 October 2002).

Honours

As player
Galatasaray
 Istanbul Football League: 1908–1909, 1909–1910, 1910–1911

See also
List of one-club men
List of Galatasaray S.K. presidents

References

1886 births
People from Üsküdar
Turkish people of Albanian descent
Albanians from the Ottoman Empire
Galatasaray S.K. (football) managers
Galatasaray S.K. presidents
Turkish football managers
Galatasaray High School alumni
Turkey national football team managers
Turkish referees and umpires
Footballers from Istanbul
1951 deaths
Burials at Feriköy Cemetery
Frashëri family
Turkish footballers
Galatasaray S.K. footballers
Association footballers not categorized by position